The Kokowalandja were an indigenous Australian people of northern Queensland.

Country

Alternative names
 Koko Katji. (Kokojelandji exonym).

Notes

Citations

Sources

Aboriginal peoples of Queensland